Alejandro Sánchez Speitzer (born 21 January 1995) is a Mexican actor.

Career
Alejandro Speitzer started his career as a child actor when he was 5 years old. His very first job was in a recurring role in the Mexican TV mini-series Ray of Light in 2000. He then starred his role as the titular character Juan "Rayito" de Luz in the childhood telenovela Rayito de luz. This was followed by another regular role in the television series Aventuras en el tiempo in 2001 as Ernesto. In 2002, he starred in La Familia P. Luche as Nino, and as Felipe in the series Cómplices Al Rescate the same year. From 2005 through 2012, he appeared in Misión S.O.S, Mujer, Casos de la Vida Real, Bajo las riendas del amor, Atrévete a soñar, Esperanza del corazón, La rosa de Guadalupe, and Amy, the Girl with the Blue Schoolbag.

Between the years of 2013 through 2017, he starred in Mentir para Vivir, Como dice el dicho, El Dandy, Bajo el mismo cielo, El Chema, Guerra de Idolos, Me gusta, pero me asusta and Milagros de Navidad.

In 2018, Alejandro starred in television series Lady of Steel and Enemigo íntimo. In 2019, he starred in telenovela La Reina del Sur and crime drama The Club, where he played the leading role with Minnie West and Jorge Caballero. In 2020, he starred in two Netflix projects: the television series Dark Desire and the miniseries Someone Has To Die.

Filmography

Film

Television series

Awards and nominations

References

External links

Living people
Mexican male telenovela actors
21st-century Mexican male actors
Mexican male television actors
Male actors from Sinaloa
People from Culiacán
Mexican people of German descent
1995 births